Paul L. Dujardin (10 May 1894, in Tourcoing – 17 April 1959) was a French water polo player who competed in the 1924 Summer Olympics and in the 1928 Summer Olympics. In 1924 he was part of the French team which won the gold medal. He played all four matches as goalkeeper. Four years later he was a member of the French team, which won the bronze medal. He played all six matches as goalkeeper.

See also
 France men's Olympic water polo team records and statistics
 List of Olympic champions in men's water polo
 List of Olympic medalists in water polo (men)
 List of men's Olympic water polo tournament goalkeepers

References

External links
 

1894 births
1959 deaths
Sportspeople from Tourcoing
French male water polo players
Water polo goalkeepers
Water polo players at the 1924 Summer Olympics
Water polo players at the 1928 Summer Olympics
Olympic water polo players of France
Olympic gold medalists for France
Olympic bronze medalists for France
Olympic medalists in water polo
Medalists at the 1928 Summer Olympics
Medalists at the 1924 Summer Olympics
19th-century French people
20th-century French people